Ker Baillie-Hamilton  (13 July 1804 – 6 February 1889) was a British colonial administrator. He was born in Cleveland, England, and died in Tunbridge Wells, England.

Hamilton was educated at the Royal Military College, Woolwich, where he went on to serve in Mauritius and the Cape of Good Hope. In 1846 became governor of Grenada. Beginning in 1851 he was the administrator of Barbados and the Windward Islands. In 1852 Hamilton was appointed governor of Newfoundland.

Hamilton antagonized the Newfoundland Liberal Party by impeding the decision of the British government in 1854 to grant responsible government. He was quickly transferred by the colonial office and appointed governor of Antigua and the Leeward Islands in March 1855. He was appointed a Companion of the Order of the Bath in the 1862 Birthday Honours.

See also
 Governors of Newfoundland
 List of people from Newfoundland and Labrador

References

External links
Biography at Government House The Governorship of Newfoundland and Labrador
Biography at the Dictionary of Canadian Biography Online

1804 births
1889 deaths
Ker
British East India Company Army officers
Companions of the Order of the Bath
Governors of Antigua and Barbuda
Governors of Barbados
Governors of British Grenada
Governors of Newfoundland Colony
Graduates of the Royal Military Academy, Woolwich